Leonard Page Moore (July 2, 1898 – December 7, 1982) was a United States circuit judge of the United States Court of Appeals for the Second Circuit.

Education and career

Born in Evanston, Illinois, Moore was in the United States Naval Reserve from 1918 to 1919, and then received an Artium Baccalaureus from Amherst College in 1919 and a Bachelor of Laws from Columbia Law School in 1922. He entered private practice in New York City, New York from 1922 to 1953. From 1953 to 1957, Moore was United States Attorney for the Eastern District of New York.

Federal judicial service

On September 6, 1957, Moore received a recess appointment from President Dwight D. Eisenhower to a seat on the United States Court of Appeals for the Second Circuit vacated by the death of Judge Jerome Frank. Formally nominated by President Eisenhower to the same seat on January 13, 1958, Moore was confirmed by the United States Senate on February 25, 1958, and received his commission on February 27, 1958. He assumed senior status on March 1, 1971, serving in that capacity until his death on December 7, 1982, in Mystic, Connecticut.

Clerk

Michael S. Greco, former president of the American Bar Association, clerked for Moore.

References

Sources
 

Amherst College alumni
Columbia Law School alumni
United States Attorneys for the Eastern District of New York
1898 births
1982 deaths
People from Evanston, Illinois
New York (state) lawyers
Judges of the United States Court of Appeals for the Second Circuit
United States court of appeals judges appointed by Dwight D. Eisenhower
20th-century American judges